The 1965–66 Hong Kong First Division League season was the 55th since its establishment.

League table

References
1965–66 Hong Kong First Division table (RSSSF)

Hong Kong First Division League seasons
Hong
football